Gavin Pyper (born 12 August 1979 in Blairgowrie, Scotland) is a British motor racing driver.

Racing career

He first made a big impression in racing by winning the Formula Vauxhall winter series with team DFR. In 1999 he entered the Vauxhall Vectra SRi V6 Challenge with Lloyds UDT, getting two wins in the year. When the British Touring Car Championship started a second class B in 2000 to boost the size of the grid, he entered an Alfa Romeo 156 which was run by former touring car driver Gary Ayles. For 2001 the BTCC changed its regulations, with class B now called production class, Pyper drove again with an Alfa Romeo 156 this time for GA Janspeed. He finished sixth in class in what was a large and competitive field. With the newly named GA Motorsport a year later, he did even better, finishing fourth in class. For 2003, GA Motorsport and Pyper stepped up to the main touring class with a Vauxhall Astra Coupé. Despite making a great start, leading the independents points at the halfway point, a lack of funding brought an early end to his season with his seat being taken by Paul Wallace. He still finished the season in fifth in the independents despite his short season. He made another BTCC challenge in 2004, but again finances saw him only enter for one meeting all season.

Racing record

Complete British Touring Car Championship results
(key) Races in bold indicate pole position (1 point awarded 2001-2002 all races, 2003-2004 just for first race, 2000–2002 in class) Races in italics indicate fastest lap (1 point awarded 2001-2004 all races, 2000–2002 in class) * signifies that driver lead race for at least one lap (1 point given 2001 just for feature race, 2003-2004 all races, 2001 for leading in class)

Sources 
 BTCC Racing page
 Driver page

External links 
 Mardi Gras Motorsport website

1979 births
Living people
Scottish racing drivers
British Touring Car Championship drivers
People from Blairgowrie and Rattray
Porsche Carrera Cup GB drivers
Renault UK Clio Cup drivers